Antony Higginbotham (born 16 December 1989) is a British Conservative politician who was elected as the Member of Parliament (MP) for Burnley in the 2019 general election.

Early life 
Higginbotham was born in Haslingden, Rossendale, Lancashire. He attended Haslingden High School and went on to study British Politics at Hull University, becoming the first in his family to attend university.

After graduating, he briefly worked for the NHS. He then went on to complete a Graduate Diploma in Law at City Law School. Before becoming an MP, he worked for a trade organisation representing international banks. He then worked as a banker, first for a Japanese bank then as a banker at NatWest.

Political career 
While living in London, he unsuccessfully contested the Peninsula ward in the 2018 Greenwich London Borough Council election.

He contested the Burnley seat for the Conservative Party in the 2019 general election, campaigning on a pro-Brexit platform in an area that voted 66.6% in favour of leave in the 2016 United Kingdom European Union membership referendum. He won the seat from incumbent Julie Cooper (9.7% swing, 3.4% majority), becoming the first Conservative MP for the constituency since Gerald Arbuthnot in 1910.

Higginbotham and the Burnley Council submitted a bid in June 2021 for £20m to improve constituency life through three construction projects.

He is a member of the Armed Forces Parliamentary Scheme, which includes 12 months of courses on military affairs to help improve parliamentary knowledge on the military.

Higginbotham endorsed Liz Truss during the July–September 2022 Conservative Party leadership election, citing her views on tax, education and 'levelling up'.

Personal life
Higginbotham is openly gay and one of 20 LGBT+ Conservative MPs.

References

External links

1989 births
Living people
UK MPs 2019–present
Conservative Party (UK) MPs for English constituencies
English LGBT politicians
LGBT members of the Parliament of the United Kingdom
People from Haslingden
Politics of Burnley
21st-century English politicians
Gay politicians
21st-century LGBT people